The following is a list of transfers for the 2020Major League Soccer (MLS) season that have been made during the 2019–20 MLS offseason all the way through to the roster freeze on October 29, 2020.

Transfers

References 

2020

Major League Soccer
Major League Soccer